Philo of Byblos (Phílōn Býblios; ;  – 141), also known as Herennius Philon, was an antiquarian writer of grammatical, lexical and historical works in Greek. He is chiefly known for his Phoenician history assembled from the writings of Sanchuniathon.

Life
Philo was born in the 1st century in Byblos in what is now Lebanon. "He lived into the reign of Hadrian, of which he wrote a history, now lost." His name "Herennius" suggests that he was a client of the consul suffectus Herennius Severus through whom Philo may have achieved the status of a Roman citizen.

Works
Philo wrote a dictionary of synonyms, a collection of scientific writers and their works organized by category, a catalogue of cities with their famous citizens, and a Vita of the Emperor Hadrian. Some of his work is known to us by titles only; others have survived in fragmentary quotes in Christian authors. Among his works were:
On the Acquisition and Choice of Books
On Cities and their Famous Men, epitomized by the grammarian Aelius Serenus, and one of the chief authorities used by Hesychius and Stephanus of Byzantium
On Synonyms, of which there is extant an epitome by Ammonius Grammaticus.

"But he is chiefly known for his translation of the Phoenician history of Sanchuniathon, who was said to have lived before the Trojan war. Of this work considerable fragments have been preserved, chiefly by Eusebius in the Praeparatio evangelica (i.9; iv.16). They present a euhemeristic réchauffé of Phoenician theology and mythology, which is represented as translated from the original Phoenician". Sanchuniathon was thought by some scholars to be "an imaginary personage, whose name is formed from that of the Phoenician god Sanchon". However Edinburgh Professor P. B. R. Forbes wrote that 14th century BC documents from Ras Shamra (ancient Ugarit), published since 1929, have "proved conclusively that Sanchuniathon is doubtless a verity in view of the many correspondences between him and these fresh texts".

Philo's Greek Phoenician History was so extensively quoted by Eusebius of Caesarea in his 4th century work Praeparatio evangelica that the fragments have been assembled and translated. Eusebius's quotations often have an agenda contrary to Philo's original intentions: the sources of Phoenician religion are quoted simply in order to disparage. Philo's passages show a jumbling together of Phoenician lore with Greek mythology, Zoroastrian beliefs  and ancient Egyptian beliefs concerning the ibis-headed god, Thoth, who in Philo is called Taautos or Tauthos. In Philo as among the ancient Egyptians, Taautos/Thoth is given characteristics that were much argued in 4th century Christology: "everlasting, unbegotten, undivided". Allusions to serpent veneration mingled with the cult of Thoth are also found.

According to Eusebius, Philo discovered secret mythological writings of the ancient Phoenicians assembled by the Phoenician writer Sanchuniathon who, according to Eusebius/Philo, transcribed the sacred lore from pillars in the temples of Byblos. Philo also translated all (or some) parts of the work in his Phoenician History. According to Porphyry, Sanchuniathon wrote a history of the Jews, based on information derived from Hierombal (i.e. Jeruba'al), a priest of the god Jevo, and dedicated it to Abelbal or Abibal, king of Berytus.

The sequence of the gods and their genealogy among the Phoenicians, as gleaned from Philo's quoted fragments, were for long recognized as supporting the general scheme in Hesiod's Theogony. Names of deities on the cuneiform tablets from Ugarit (modern Ras Shamra, Syria) fall into similar patterns. Compare the genealogical tables at Sanchuniathon.

Notes

References
 Harold W. Attridge and Robert A. Oden, Philo of Byblos: Phoenician History, Introduction, Critical Text, Translation, Notes, Catholic Biblical Quarterly Monograph Series, 1981.
 Albert I. Baumgarten, The Phoenician History of Philo of Byblos, 1981.
 Peter Barr Reid Forbes, "Philon of Byblos" in The Oxford Classical Dictionary, New York, New York.: Oxford University Press, 1991.
 Pedro Pablo Fuentes González, "Philon de Byblos", in R. Goulet (ed.), Dictionnaire des Philosophes Antiques, vol. Va, Paris, CNRS, 2012, p. 392-399.

External links

Greek-language historians from the Roman Empire
64 births
141 deaths
Ancient Greek grammarians
Ancient Greek lexicographers
Ancient Greek mythographers
People from Byblos
Philo
Byblos
Phoenician writers
1st-century Greek people
2nd-century Greek people
1st-century Romans
2nd-century Romans
2nd-century historians
1st-century Phoenician people
2nd-century Phoenician people